Riihijärvi is a Finnish surname. Notable people with the surname include:

Juha Riihijärvi (born 1969), Finnish ice hockey player
Teemu Riihijärvi (born 1977), Finnish ice hockey player

Finnish-language surnames